PCAA, or 5-[N-(1-phenylcyclohexyl)amino]pentanoic acid, is a metabolite of phencyclidine (PCP).  It can be detected in the urine of PCP users by mass spectrometry as means of drug screening.

References

Amines
Carboxylic acids
Recreational drug metabolites